Francesco Frangialli served as Secretary-General of the United Nations World Tourism Organization, from 1997 to 2009.

He is an honorary professor at the School of Hotel and Tourism Management at Hong Kong Polytechnic University.

Publications

References

World Tourism Organization people
Tourism ministers
Living people
Italian officials of the United Nations
Year of birth missing (living people)